is Juice=Juice's major debut single. The single was released on September 11, 2013 in 6 editions: a regular and 5 limited editions. The single was originally planned to be released as a single A-side titled "Romance no Tochū", but due to Aina Otsuka's departure, it was later decided to release it as a triple A-side. It debuted in 2nd place on the weekly Oricon Singles Chart.

CD

Romance no Tochū
Watashi ga Iu Mae ni Dakishimenakya ne (MEMORIAL EDIT)
Samidare Bijo ga Samidareru (MEMORIAL EDIT)
Romance no Tochuu -Instrumental-
Watashi ga Iu Mae ni Dakishimenakya ne (MEMORIAL EDIT) -Instrumental-
Samidare Bijo ga Samidareru (MEMORIAL EDIT) -Instrumental-

Limited Edition A DVD

Romance no Tochuu -Music Video-
Romance no Tochuu -Dance Shot Ver.-

Limited Edition B DVD

Watashi ga Iu Mae ni Dakishimenakya ne (MEMORIAL EDIT) -Music Video-
Watashi ga Iu Mae ni Dakishimenakya ne (MEMORIAL EDIT) -Dance Shot Ver.-

Limited Edition C DVD

Samidare Bijo ga Samidareru (MEMORIAL EDIT) -Music Video-
Samidare Bijo ga Samidareru (MEMORIAL EDIT) -Dance Shot Ver.-

Limited Edition D DVD

Watashi ga Iu Mae ni Dakishimenakya ne (MEMORIAL EDIT) -Close-Up Ver.-
Watashi ga Iu Mae ni Dakishimenakya ne (MEMORIAL EDIT) -Dance Shot Ver.II-

Limited Edition E DVD

Samidare Bijo ga Samidareru (MEMORIAL EDIT) -Close-Up Ver.-
Samidare Bijo ga Samidareru (MEMORIAL EDIT) -Dance Shot Ver.II-

Featured Members
Yuka Miyazaki
Tomoko Kanazawa
Sayuki Takagi
Karin Miyamoto
Akari Uemura

Single Information
Romance no Tochuu
Lyrics, Composition: Tsunku
Arrangement: Shunsuke Suzuki
Main Vocals: Karin Miyamoto
Sub Vocal: Sayuki Takagi, Tomoko Kanazawa
Minor Vocals: Akari Uemura, Yuka Miyazaki

References

External links
Official website
Discography: Hello! Project, UP-FRONT WORKS
Major debut, single announcement
Articles: Yahoo, Natalie, Oricon, Mantan, Musicheaps
Lyrics: Watashi ga Iu Mae ni Dakishimenakya ne (MEMORIAL EDIT)

2013 singles
Juice=Juice songs
2013 songs